KRNT (1350 AM) is a radio station broadcasting a sports format. Serving the Des Moines, Iowa, United States, area, the station is owned by the Des Moines Radio Group subsidiary of Saga Communications through licensee Saga Communications of Iowa, LLC.

Studios are located on Locust Street in Des Moines, with its 4-tower transmitter array located on King Avenue in Des Moines.

Programming

KRNT features programming from ESPN Radio.  In addition, it serves as the broadcast outlet for several sports teams:
 Drake University athletics (football, men's and women's basketball)
 Chicago Cubs baseball

History

KSO
The station was first licensed on October 9, 1925 to the A. A. Berry Seed Company in Clarinda, Iowa, transmitting on 1240 kHz, with the call sign KSO. The call letters reflected the slogan "Keep Serving Others".  

In 1926, an adverse legal decision briefly eliminated the ability of the U.S. government to assign station frequencies and powers, and as of December 31, 1926 KSO was reported to now be at 740 kHz. The next year government control was re-established with the formation of the Federal Radio Commission (FRC), and on July 1, 1927 KSO was reassigned to 1320 kHz. Effective November 11, 1928, with the implementation of the FRC's General Order 40, the station moved to 1380 kHz.

On June 26, 1931, the Cowles family, publishers of the Des Moines Register and Tribune, bought KSO, via the Iowa Broadcasting Company. The new owners received permission to move KSO from Clarinda to Des Moines, and to begin broadcasting on 1370 kHz. KSO made its debut broadcast from the new location on November 5, 1932. In 1934, KSO was reassigned to 1320 kHz.

KRNT

On March 17, 1935, the KSO call letters were transferred to the former KWCR on 1430 kHz, which was relocated from Cedar Rapids to Des Moines. This same day the call letters of the original KSO on 1320 kHz were changed to KRNT. At that time, both stations were owned and operated by subsidiary corporations of the Des Moines Register-Tribune.

In March, 1941, stations on 1320 kHz, including KRNT, were moved to the 1350 kHz, as part of the North American Regional Broadcasting Agreement. In August 1941, the Federal Communications Commission (FCC) began implementation of a "duopoly" rule, which restricted licensees from operating more than one radio station in a given market.

KRNT won a Peabody Award in 1945 for outstanding reporting of news. 

Then-owners Cowles Media started up a sister station, KRNT-FM (104.5) in 1948, but took it off the air and returned the license in 1955. In 1970, they signed on a second KRNT-FM (102.5 FM).

For years, KRNT carried an adult standards format, supplemented by sports programming (most notably the Chicago Cubs and Drake University athletics). In 2015, the adult standards format was moved to sister station KAZR's HD2 subchannel and translator K283CC 104.5 FM. KRNT was rebranded ESPN Des Moines as it became the market's ESPN Radio affiliate.

In April, 2022, station owner Saga Communications requested a waiver to change the call sign back to the original KSO. However, broadcasting stations were now generally required to have four letter call signs, and the FCC was unwilling to make an exception.

Previous logos

References

External links

FCC History Cards for KRNT (covering 1927-1980 as KSO/KRNT)

RNT
Radio stations established in 1925
1925 establishments in Iowa